Frederick Charles Nicholson (19 April 1885 – c. 1975) was a rugby union player who represented Australia.

Nicholson, a wing, was born in Brisbane, Queensland and claimed one international rugby cap for Australia, playing against Great Britain, at Sydney, on 30 July 1904. His brother Frank was also an Australian rugby union representative player.

References

Australian rugby union players
Australia international rugby union players
1885 births
Year of death missing
Rugby union players from Brisbane
Rugby union wings